Anguran (also Romanized as Angūrān) is a village in Anguran Rural District of Anguran District of Mahneshan County, Zanjan province, Iran. At the 2006 National Census, its population was 1,068 in 261 households. The following census in 2011 counted 1,123 people in 343 households. The latest census in 2016 showed a population of 1,282 people in 400 households; it was the largest village in its rural district.

References 

Mahneshan County

Populated places in Zanjan Province

Populated places in Mahneshan County